Spathulina acroleuca is a species of tephritid or fruit flies in the family Tephritidae.

Distribution
Egypt, widespread Afrotropical, Oriental, & Australasian Regions.

References

Tephritinae
Insects described in 1868
Taxa named by Ignaz Rudolph Schiner
Diptera of Africa
Diptera of Asia
Diptera of Australasia